The Piorun (meaning "thunderbolt" in Polish) is a man-portable air-defense system of Polish production, designed to destroy low-flying aircraft, airplanes, helicopters and unmanned aerial vehicles.  The set is a deep modernization of the PPZR Grom set, therefore the second designation of the missile is Grom-M. 

The full name of the set is PPZR Piorun (pol. Przenośny Przeciwlotniczy Zestaw Rakietowy Piorun).

History 
The Piorun Portable Anti-Aircraft Missile System is produced by the Mesko company and was created as a result of the GROM system modernization carried out in 2010–15. As part of the modernization, the effectiveness of the homing warhead was significantly improved by increasing the sensitivity of detection, which increased the distance at which the missile is able to target and hit the target, increased resistance to interference was obtained, a proximity fuze was used, an access authorization system and the set for fire was adapted in night conditions.

In 2016, the Ministry of National Defence signed a contract for the purchase of 420 launchers (launch mechanisms) and 1,300 rockets for the Armed Forces of the Republic of Poland, planned for 2017–2020 delivery. Due to delays caused by technical problems with the propulsion system, the delivery of rockets and launch devices began in 2019 after successful testing. In 2020, Piorun missiles were fired from Poprad self-propelled anti-aircraft missile systems. The missiles are used not only by Poprad, but also by anti-aircraft missile and artillery system PSR-A Pilica.

In 2022, Poland announced the rapid supply of Ukraine with Pioruns during the 2021–2022 Russo-Ukrainian crisis.

Operational history 
During the 2022 Russian invasion of Ukraine, the Armed Forces of Ukraine alleged that a number of Russian jet fighters (Su-34, Su-25) and helicopters (Mi-24, Ka-52) were shot down with Piorun missiles.

Operators 

 100 launchers with 300 missiles ordered in September 2022.
/ Undisclosed number ordered by one of the Baltic states.
 Undisclosed number ordered in November 2022.
 At least 1,300 missiles were delivered. Another order of 3,500 missiles alongside 600 MANPAD launchers is to be delivered in 2022.
 Undisclosed number delivered in 2022.
 Undisclosed number ordered in 2022.

References 

Guided missiles of Poland
21st-century surface-to-air missiles
Science and technology in Poland
Polish inventions